|}

The Prix Texanita is a Group 3 flat horse race in France open to three-year-old thoroughbreds. It is run over a distance of 1,100 metres (about 5½ furlongs) at Maisons-Laffitte in May.

History
The event is named after Texanita, a successful French-trained sprinter in the 1960s. It was established in 2013, and initially held Listed status.

The Prix Texanita was promoted to Group 3 level in 2015. The promotion was part of a restructured programme for three-year-old sprinters in Europe.

Records
Leading jockey:
 no jockey has won this race more than once

Leading trainer (2 wins):
 Henri-Alex Pantall – Rangali (2014), Goken (2015)
 Freddy Head - Mazameer (2013), Aladdine (2017)
 Didier Guillemin - Alistair (2018), Ilanga (2019)

Leading owner:
 no owner has won this race more than once

Winners

See also
 List of French flat horse races

References

 Racing Post:
 galopp-sieger.de – Prix Texanita.
 horseracingintfed.com – International Federation of Horseracing Authorities – Prix Texanita (2018).

Flat horse races for three-year-olds
Maisons-Laffitte Racecourse
Horse races in France
2013 establishments in France
Recurring sporting events established in 2013